Pan-Européenne is a French film production and publishing company. Originally only distribution company, in 1992 it began also a production company, producing Beau fixe. It has produced various films, including Jaco Van Dormael's The Eighth Day (1996) and Mr. Nobody (2009), Jérôme Salle's Largo Winch (2008), and distributed Bryan Singer's The Usual Suspects (1995), Frank Miller and Robert Rodriguez's Sin City (2005).

History
Pan-Européenne was created in the late 1980s by Philippe Godeau. By distributing films such as Jaco Van Dormael's Toto the Hero (1991), Cyril Collard's Savage Nights (1992), and Jacques Audiard's See How They Fall (1994), Pan-Européenne began its activity of production company. The film studio Polygram entrusted to the company the distribution of their films in France. In 1999 it ended the partnership following the acquisition of Polygram by Universal. The restructuring of the group divides into two branches the company: Pan-Européenne Edition, an independent distribution created in 2001, and Pan-Européenne Production.

In 2004, Wild Bunch chose Pan-Européenne Edition for the distribution in French market. After the association of Pan-Européenne and Wild Bunch in distributing films in France, Pan-Européenne Edition took the name of Wild Bunch Distribution in 2006. Since then, Pan-Européenne Production became Pan-Européenne and the company began a series of international projects such as Largo Winch (2008), filmed in Malta, Sicily and Hong Kong, and Mr. Nobody (2009), a co-production of Belgium, Canada, France and Germany.

In April 2022, Pan-Européenne created Pan Distribution, re-entering the distribution business.

Selected films
Among the films directly produced by Pan-Européenne were:
Beau fixe (1992)
The Eighth Day (1996)
Bad Company (1999)
Baise-moi (2000)
Lightweight (2004)
Les Sœurs fâchées (2004)
How Much Do You Love Me? (2005)
The Man of My Life (2006)
Détrompez-vous (2007)
Largo Winch (2008)
Mr. Nobody (2009)
One for the Road (2009)
Romantics Anonymous (2010)
11.6 (2013)
The Odyssey (2016)
Garde alternée (2017)

References

External links
 

Companies established in the 1980s
Film production companies of France
Film distributors of France

Mass media in Paris